Tseel may refer to one of several sums (districts) in different aimags (provinces) of Mongolia:

 Tseel, Govi-Altai
 Tseel, Töv